Braidwood may refer to:

People
 Braidwood (surname)

Places
 Braidwood, New South Wales, Australia
 Braidwood, South Lanarkshire, Scotland
 Braidwood, Illinois, United States of America

Things 
 Braidwood Inquiry - an inquiry into a Taser incident in Vancouver, Canada
 Braidwood Nuclear Generating Station, Illinois, United States of America 
 Braidwood - An abandoned Intel project, successor to Intel Turbo Memory